Songshan is a town and the seat of Ziyun Miao and Buyei Autonomous County in southwestern Guizhou province, China. , it has five residential communities and 26 villages under its administration.

References

Towns in Guizhou